Sainte-Croix-de-Mareuil (literally Sainte-Croix of Mareuil; Limousin: Senta Crotz de Maruelh) is a commune in the Dordogne department in Nouvelle-Aquitaine in southwestern France.

Population

Geography
The Lizonne forms part of the commune's northern border.

See also
Communes of the Dordogne department

References

Communes of Dordogne